Oiartzun is a railway station in Oiartzun, Basque Country, Spain. It is owned by Euskal Trenbide Sarea and operated by Euskotren. It lies on the San Sebastián-Hendaye railway, popularly known as the Topo line.

History 
The station opened in 1912 as part of the San Sebastián-Hendaye railway. It entered service provisionally with a single track on 5 March, and on 31 July trains started running on the second track.

Services 
The station is served by Euskotren Trena line E2. It runs every 15 minutes during weekdays and weekend afternoons, and every 30 minutes on weekend mornings.

References 

Euskotren Trena stations
Railway stations in Gipuzkoa
Railway stations opened in 1912
1912 establishments in Spain
Railway stations in Spain opened in 2011
2011 establishments in the Basque Country (autonomous community)